The Gurguiata is a left tributary of the river Bahlui in Romania. It discharges into the Bahlui near Belcești. The Gurguiata valley has been heavily modified by human activity. There are many storage reservoirs in the valley, used mainly for flood control and for intensive fishing. The largest of these is Lake Plopi, located northeast of Belcești.

References

Rivers of Romania
Rivers of Iași County